The 1959 Detroit Lions season was their 30th in the league. The team failed to improve on their previous season's output of 4–7–1, winning only three games. They missed the playoffs for the second straight season.

Schedule 

 Thursday (November 26: Thanksgiving)

Standings

References 

Detroit Lions seasons
Detroit Lions
Detroit Lions